R519 road may refer to:
 R519 road (Ireland)
 R519 (South Africa)